The Medal for Outstanding Civic Service or Medaljen for Borgerdåd is the second highest ranked Norwegian medal. In spring 2004 the medal ceased to be awarded. The medal was first established by Royal Resolution April 10, 1819 and later altered by Royal Resolution April 13, 1844. It was awarded by the cabinet meeting presided over by the King after a recommendation by the Norwegian Ministry of Justice.

It is divided into two grades: the first class is in gold and the second class is in silver.

Recipients of the Medal for Outstanding Civic Achievement are ranked 2nd in the Norwegian order of precedence, after recipients of the War Cross with sword and before holders of the Royal Norwegian Order of St. Olav.

Recipients 

Gold
 Haakon VII of Norway
 Olav V of Norway
 Hans Riddervold
Silver
 Alfred Eriksen
 Ole Olsen Evenstad (born 1766)
 C. J. Hambro
 Tollef Kilde
 Trygve Lie

See also
 Orders, decorations, and medals of Norway

References

External links
 http://medals.org.uk/norway/norway003.htm

Outstanding Civic Achievement, Medal of
Awards established in 1819
1819 establishments in Norway